Hoveyzeh (also romanized as Huwaiza, Havizeh, Hawiza, Hawīzeh, Hovayze, and Hovayzeh; also known as Hūzgān or Khūzgān) is a city and capital of Hoveyzeh County, Khuzestan Province, Iran. At the 2006 census, its population was 14,422, in 2,749 families.

See also 
 Iran–Iraq war
 Khorramshahr
 Susangerd
 Shadegan
 Bostan

References

Populated places in Hoveyzeh County
Cities in Khuzestan Province
Arab settlements in Khuzestan Province